Barry Young (born 3 December 1986) is a Scottish professional wrestler. He is currently signed to WWE, where he performs on the NXT brand, under the ring name Wolfgang and he is currently one-half of the NXT Tag Team Champion with Mark Coffey in their first reign.

Professional wrestling career

WWE (2016–present)

NXT UK (2016–2022)
On 15 December 2016 it was revealed that Young would be one of 16 men competing in a two-night tournament to crown the first ever WWE United Kingdom Champion on 14 and 15 January 2017. Young defeated Tyson T-Bone in the first round, advancing to the quarter finals. In the quarter-finals, he went on to defeat Trent Seven before losing to Seven's tag team partner Tyler Bate in the semi finals.

On 13 September 2017 episode of NXT, Wolfgang faced Pete Dunne for the WWE United Kingdom Championship in a losing effort. After the match, Wolfgang was brutally attacked by The Undisputed Era (Adam Cole, Bobby Fish, and Kyle O'Reilly). This attack ended when Trent Seven and Tyler Bate came out to help Wolfgang. On 18 June 2018, it was announced that Young would fight Adam Cole on the 2nd night of the UK Championship Tournament, for the NXT North American Championship. He would go on to lose the match.

Young turned heel on the 31 October edition of NXT UK after a losing match against Mark Andrews, allying himself with brothers Mark and Joe Coffey against Andrews, Flash Morgan Webster, and Travis Banks. On the first 5 December episode of NXT UK, the trio of Wolfgang and the Coffey brothers was officially dubbed Gallus (Scottish slang for daring or confident) during a segment calling out British Strong Style, as well as the returning Travis Banks.

NXT (2022–present)
On NXT Heatwave, Gallus made their NXT 2.0  debut, attacking Diamond Mine. On 23 August 2022, Gallus made their tag team debut on NXT facing NXT UK Tag Team Champions Brooks Jensen and Josh Briggs, which they would go on to win via countout. At Worlds Collide, Gallus became the second team eliminated from the Fatal four-way tag team elimination match for the NXT and NXT UK Tag Team Championship. Gallus would go on to have a rivalry with Briggs and Jensen, with the latter winning a No Disqualification tag team match between the teams. Gallus were later suspended on September for attacking officials.

At New Year’s Evil on 10 January 2023, Gallus returned from their suspension and won a gauntlet match to become the #1 contenders for the NXT Tag Team Championship, which they won on Vengeance Day the month after.

Championships and accomplishments
British Championship Wrestling 
BCW Heavyweight Championship (1 time)
BCW Openweight Championship (2 times)
BCW Tag Team Championship (5 times) – with Darkside (3), Red Lightning (1), and James Scott (1)
Insane Championship Wrestling
 ICW World Heavyweight Championship (1 time)
ICW Zero-G Championship (1 time)
ICW "Match of the Year" Bammy Award – for Legion (Mikey Whiplash, Tommy End & Michael Dante) vs New Age Kliq (BT Gunn, Chris Renfrew & Wolfgang) at Fear & Loathing VIII (2015)
 Square Go! (2016)
Premier British Wrestling
PBW Heavyweight Championship (2 times)
PBW Tag Team Championship (1 time) – with Lionheart
PBW Heavyweight Championship Tournament (2006)
Pro Wrestling Illustrated
 Ranked No. 203 of the top 500 singles wrestlers in the PWI 500 in 2019
Rock N Wrestling
Highland Rumble (2016)
Showcase Pro Wrestling
SPW British Heavyweight Championship (1 time)
Scottish Wrestling Alliance
NWA Scottish Heavyweight Championship (2 times)
SWA Laird of the Ring Championship (1 time)
SWA Tag Team Championship (2 times) – with Falcon (1) and Darkside (1)
Laird Of The Ring Tournament (2007)
 World Wide Wrestling League
 W3L Heavyweight Champion (1 time)
 W3L Tag Team Championship (1 time) – with Darkside
 Seven Deadly Sins Tournament (2010)
Wrestle Zone Wrestling
wZw Interpromotional Championship (1 time)
 WWE
NXT Tag Team Championship (1 time, current) – with Mark Coffey
NXT UK Tag Team Championship (1 time) - with Mark Coffey

References

External links

 
 
 
 

1986 births
21st-century professional wrestlers
Living people
Scottish male professional wrestlers
Sportspeople from Glasgow
NXT Tag Team Champions
NXT UK Tag Team Champions